Uganda Martyrs' Hospital Ibanda, is a non-profit, community hospital, in the town of Ibanda, in the Western Region of Uganda. It is affiliated with the Roman Catholic Archdiocese of Mbarara and is accredited by the Uganda Catholic Medical Bureau.

Location

The geographical coordinates of Uganda Martyrs’ Hospital Ibanda are: 0°07'47.0"S, 30°26'55.0"E (Latitude:-0.129722; Longitude:30.448611).

Overview
Uganda Martyrs' Hospital Ibanda is a Roman Catholic, faith-based community hospital that serves patients in Ibanda District and surrounding communities. A small payment is expected at the time of service, although no one is turned away, because of lack of money. The hospital was established in 1968. It has a bed capacity of 178.

Hospital operations 
As of December 2019, the hospital attended to 19,097 outpatients annually, on average. At the same time, 14,715 inpatients were admitted every year, on average, with a bed occupancy ratio of 58.2 percent. The annual maternal deliveries at the hospital averaged 2,663, with a caesarian section rate of 30.62 percent. Patient user fees accounted for 68.1 percent of annual hospital income.

Other considerations
The hospital owns, manages and maintains Uganda Martyrs' Nurses' and Midwifery Training School Ibanda. The school which was established in 1995, admits between 60 and 70 students annually.

See also
List of hospitals in Uganda

References

External links
  Ibanda District Internet Portal

Hospitals in Uganda
Ibanda District
Ankole sub-region
Western Region, Uganda
Teaching hospitals in Uganda
Catholic hospitals in Africa